not to be confused with Little Witch Academia

Witch Academy is a 1995 American comedy horror film directed by Fred Olen Ray and starring Priscilla Barnes, Veronica Carothers, and Robert Vaughn.

It was written by Mark Thomas McGee and shot by Gary Graver. Ray said it was the last of his "scream queen" films as the bottom was about to drop out of that market.

Cast
Priscilla Barnes as Edith
Michelle Bauer as Tara
Veronica Carothers as Leslie / Becky
Ruth Collins as Darla
Don Dowe as Neal
John Henry Richardson (credited as Jay Richardson) as Professor Lamar
Robert Vaughn as The Devil
Steve Controneo as The Devil in make-up (uncredited)
Ron Pardina as “monster” (uncredited)

References

External links
 
 
 

1995 films
Films directed by Fred Olen Ray
1990s comedy horror films
1995 comedy films
American comedy horror films
1990s English-language films
1990s American films